The 1972 Pacific Tigers football team represented the University of the Pacific (UOP) in the 1972 NCAA University Division football season as a member of the Pacific Coast Athletic Association.

The team was led by head coach Chester Caddas, in his first year, and played home games at Pacific Memorial Stadium in Stockton, California. They finished the season with a record of eight wins and three losses (8–3, 3–1 PCAA). The Tigers outscored their opponents 232–176 for the entire season.

Schedule

Notes

References

Pacific
Pacific Tigers football seasons
Pacific Tigers football